Albert Simonin (1905–1980) was a French novelist and scriptwriter. He was born in the La Chapelle quarter of the 18th arrondissement of Paris. His father was a florist. Albert was orphaned by the age of 16. His novel Touchez Pas au Grisbi featuring the Parisian gangster Max le Menteur was turned into a movie starring Jean Gabin that is regarded as a classic example of French film noir. Simonin co-authored the screenplay for the movie.

Selected filmography
 Touchez pas au grisbi (1954)
 The Price of Love (1955)
 Short Head (1956)
 Burning Fuse (1957)
 Anyone Can Kill Me (1957)
 A Bullet in the Gun Barrel (1958)
 Le cave se rebiffe (1961)
 The Gentleman from Epsom (1962)
 Any Number Can Win, based on a novel by Zekial Marko (1963)
 Les Tontons flingueurs (1963)
 Une souris chez les hommes, based on a novel by Francis Ryck (1964)
 The Great Spy Chase (1964)
 La Métamorphose des cloportes, based on a novel by Alphonse Boudard (1965)
 Pasha, based on a novel by Jean Laborde (1968)

See also

 Candide ou l'optimisme au XXe siècle (film, 1960)

References

1905 births
1980 deaths
Writers from Paris
French collaborators with Nazi Germany
Prix des Deux Magots winners
20th-century French novelists
French crime fiction writers
French male novelists
20th-century French male writers